Jay Gilligan is a professional juggler and performer from Arcadia, Ohio currently performing and living in Europe. Jay is a teacher of juggling and works at many circus schools overseas.  He has been called one of the most famous living jugglers by writers at the usenet group rec.juggling. He has performed in many European countries and every state in America. Jay toured American cities in the summer 2006 and summer 2007 with the Shoebox Tour. Jay is also the main teacher of juggling and creator of the juggling program at the University of Dance and Circus in Stockholm, Sweden.

References

External links 
 buildingweight.com Jay Gilligan's website
 Interview with Jay Gilligan, May 1995, Juggling Information Service
 feature article, Minneapolis City Pages
 Collegian feature article, Hillsdale College  November, 2007
 Collegian photo slideshow, Hillsdale College March 2008

Living people
Year of birth missing (living people)
Jugglers